Colegio Santa Cruz de Unco is a Chilean high school located in Santa Cruz, Colchagua Province, Chile.

References 

Educational institutions with year of establishment missing
Secondary schools in Chile
Schools in Colchagua Province